Parkaleh (also Romanized as Parkeleh; also known as Fār Qal‘eh, Parkal, and Parkalehhā) is a village in Astaneh Rural District, in the Central District of Shazand County, Markazi Province, Iran. At the 2006 census, its population was 293, in 72 families.

References 

Populated places in Shazand County